General Hill may refer to:

United Kingdom
Augustus Hill (British Army officer) (1853–1921), British Army brigadier general
Edward Rowley Hill (1795–1878), British Army general
Giles Hill (fl. 1990s–2020s), British Army lieutenant general
John Hill (Indian Army officer) (1866–1935), British Indian Army major general
John Hill (courtier) (died 1735), British Army major general
John Thomas Hill (1811–1902), British Army general
Walter Hill (British Army officer) (1877–1942), British Army major general
Rowland Hill, 1st Viscount Hill (1772–1842), British Army general

United States
A. P. Hill (1825–1865), Confederate States Army lieutenant general
Benjamin J. Hill (1825–1880), Confederate States Army brigadier general
Daniel Harvey Hill (1821–1889), Confederate States Army lieutenant general
Donn Hill (fl. 1990s–2020s), U.S. Army major general
Edmund Hill (1896–1973), U.S. Army major general
Eric T. Hill (fl. 1990s–2020s), U.S. Air Force major general
Henry Root Hill (1876–1918), U.S. Army brigadier general
Homer S. Hill (1919–1992), U.S. Marine Corps major general
James A. Hill (1923–2010), U.S. Air Force four-star general
James E. Hill (1921–1999), U.S. Air Force four-star general
James T. Hill (born 1946), U.S. Army four-star general
John G. Hill Jr. (1926–1999), U.S. Army major general
Tex Hill (1915–2007), U.S. Army Air Forces brigadier general
Walter Newell Hill (1881–1955), U.S. Marine Corps brigadier general
William P. T. Hill (1895–1965), U.S. Marine Corps major general

Other
Benjamín G. Hill (1874–1920), Mexican Revolutionary general
Frederic William Hill (1866–1954), Canadian Expeditionary Force brigadier general

See also
Attorney General Hill (disambiguation)